Joseph Bristow is a professor of English literature at UCLA; he specializes in Nineteenth Century and Twentieth Century British Literature, and sexuality studies. He is most known for his books on the history of sexuality, Victorian poetry, and his work as a critic and editor of late Victorian literary texts.

Education
Bristow received his BA from the University of London, his MA from University of Stirling, and his PhD in English from University of Southampton.

Scholarship
His most important books of criticism include Sexuality (1997), Effeminate England: Homoerotic Writing after 1885 (1997), Empire Boys: Adventures in a Man's World (1991) and Robert Browning: New Readings (1991).  He has also served as editor on The Fin-de-Siècle Poem (2005), Oscar Wilde, The Picture of Dorian Gray (2004), Wilde Writings: Contextual Conditions (2003), The Cambridge Companion to Victorian Poetry (2000), among other edited collections.

Awards
Professor Bristow's research has been supported by several fellowships from institutions such as the British Academy, the Wingate Foundation, St John's College, Oxford, National Endowment for the Humanities, and the Stanford Humanities Center.

Notes

Year of birth missing (living people)
Living people
University of California, Los Angeles faculty
British expatriate academics in the United States
Alumni of the University of London
Alumni of the University of Stirling
Alumni of the University of Southampton